Eumenodora is a genus of moth in the family Xyloryctidae. It was formerly placed in the family Cosmopterigidae.

Species
Eumenodora encrypta Meyrick, 1906
Eumenodora tetrachorda Meyrick, 1924

References
Natural History Museum Lepidoptera genus database

Xyloryctidae
Xyloryctidae genera